Five Nights at Freddy's: Help Wanted is a 2019 virtual reality horror video game developed by Steel Wool Studios and published by ScottGames. It is the seventh main game in the Five Nights at Freddy's series, following Freddy Fazbear's Pizzeria Simulator and the ninth installment overall, following Ultimate Custom Night. It presents itself as "The Freddy Fazbear Virtual Experience", produced for the fictitious corporative entity Fazbear Entertainment to help improve its public image after a series of debilitating lawsuits, following several incidents and disasters that allegedly occurred at their various locations.

Gameplay is presented from the first-person perspective and focuses on a series of minigames based on previous games in the series, in which the player must evade attacks from sentient animatronics. The game's canon establishes that Fazbear Entertainment hired an unnamed indie developer to create a video game series based on the events of the previous seven games, before cutting ties with him, and commissioned a virtual reality game meant to make light of the rumors and convince players that those events were completely fictitious.

Development of Five Nights at Freddy's: Help Wanted, the first licensed game by Steel Wool Studios, began in 2018 and took less than a year. The game's design took inspiration from the history of Five Nights at Freddy's across all media. First announced in August 2018, the game was released on May 28, 2019, for HTC Vive and Oculus Rift headsets on Microsoft Windows, and PlayStation VR headsets on PlayStation 4. A non-VR version of the game was released for Microsoft Windows and PlayStation 4 on December 17, 2019. A Nintendo Switch port was released on May 21, 2020. An Oculus Quest port was released on July 16, 2020. An Android port was released on October 26, 2020, and an iOS port was released the following day. An Xbox One port was then released three days later. The game received generally positive reviews from critics, who praised it for its narrative, content, voice performance and original soundtrack. and is among the top selling virtual reality games on Steam. Downloadable content, Curse of Dreadbear, was released on October 23, 2019. A spin-off set after the events of the game, Five Nights at Freddy's: Special Delivery, was released on November 25, 2019, for Android and iOS, while a main game sequel, Five Nights at Freddy's: Security Breach, was released on December 16, 2021.

Gameplay
The game contains forty playable minigames, which can be accessed from the game's hub. Many of these minigames recreate the mechanics of the previous games in the series, with their controls adapted to be better suited for a 3D virtual environment. The minigames are divided into groups by game of origin, and sorted by increasing difficulty. In all minigames, losing results in a jumpscare.

The original Five Nights at Freddy's inspires five minigames that recreate each of the game's five nights (levels). Situated in a security guard's office, the player must survive a full night shift by conserving power and avoiding attacks from four animatronics, which can be observed through security cameras. All visuals of the game are updated from 2D renders to 3D models, and all buttons and controls are laid out around the 3D office for the player to physically interact with. For example, the camera feed, which previously obscured the player's entire screen, is displayed on a monitor on the player's desk. Five Nights at Freddy's 2 and Five Nights at Freddy's 3 are adapted in a similar manner, with updated visuals and concrete UI.

Five Nights at Freddy's 4 inspires six minigames. The Night Terrors minigames adapt the gameplay of its main levels, in which the player must ward off animatronics from entering their bedroom by strategically opening and closing the doors. Some of these minigames allow the player to move by "teleporting" to different locations within view, a common VR locomotion method. The first level features Funtime Freddy, the second level features Nightmarionne, the third level features Circus Baby, and the fourth level features Nightmare Fredbear. The original game's "Fun with Plushtrap" and "Fun with Balloon Boy" minigames are adapted as Dark Rooms minigames, in which the player must use a flashlight to locate the animatronic around an unlit area.

Five Nights at Freddy's: Sister Location inspires nine minigames. The Parts & Service minigames require the player to perform maintenance on animatronics by opening compartments and swapping parts around their bodies, this time around done on Bonnie, Chica, Freddy, and Foxy. Vent Repair takes place in a maintenance shaft, in which the player must solve puzzles by flipping levers and pressing buttons while repelling animatronics with a headlamp, mainly Mangle and Ennard. One Dark Rooms game, featuring Funtime Foxy, is also adapted from Sister Location.

Winning each minigame in normal difficulty unlocks its counterpart in Blacklight Mode, an advanced difficulty mode that adds visual and/or auditory distractions to each game (e.g. balloons floating around the room, loud music playing, et cetera). Winning all minigames in both difficulty modes unlocks one final minigame, Pizza Party. Unlike the other minigames, Pizza Party is a maze which utilizes teleporting movement, similar to Night Terrors and featuring items from various levels along with many of the animatronics in the game in some rooms.

Collectible coins and cassette tapes are hidden throughout the various minigames. Collecting coins unlocks virtual toys that can be played with at the in-game Prize Counter, while collecting tapes unlocks audio logs that the player can listen to.

Plot
Fazbear Entertainment has become very unpopular due to several incidents and disasters that allegedly occurred at their various locations over the years, which have been established as urban legends. This problem is aggravated by a horror video game series based on the legends, created by an unnamed indie developer. In an attempt to overturn the bad reputation these rumors gave the company, Fazbear Entertainment commissioned the "Freddy Fazbear Virtual Experience", a virtual reality game meant to make light of the rumors and convince players that those events were completely fictitious. However, this narrative is contradicted by sixteen cassette tapes hidden throughout the game, which contain logs recorded by one of the game's developers.

Meant as a warning for future players, the tapes expose a lawsuit happening during the game's development, involving an incident with a past employee, Jeremy, that put the game's completion in jeopardy. In addition, the tapes reveal that Fazbear Entertainment hired the unnamed indie developer to create the video game series based on the alleged legends, before cutting ties with him; the games were part of an elaborate ploy to discredit the rumors surrounding the company. Most importantly, the tapes warn of a malicious code that was uploaded to the game from an old animatronic's circuit board. This code takes the form of a sinister character known as Glitchtrap, who appears as a humanoid in a rabbit costume. Glitchtrap is ultimately revealed to be the digital ghost of William Afton, Fazbear's serial killer co-founder, who is attempting to escape from the game by merging with the player. It is implied that the circuit board containing the code was acquired from the remains of "Scraptrap", who was possessed by Afton.

Five Nights at Freddy's: Help Wanted contains four endings, depending on the player's choice:
 Upon completing all thirty-nine levels and playing the final level "Pizza Party", the player will enter a dark room with animatronics and a tape. Glitchtrap will appear and gesture for the player to follow him behind a curtain. After doing so, the player will appear on a stage as Freddy Fazbear while a show starts, implying they were stuffed into an animatronic like the original murdered children, while Glitchtrap is seen dancing gleefully in the background.
 If the player follows the tapes' instructions, they will be taken to a room with handprints and scratches all over it. Glitchtrap will appear on the other side of a door, shushing the player before backing up into the darkness. After this, the player will receive a Glitchtrap plush. Upon completing the secret ending of the Curse of Dreadbear Corn Maze, where they receive a rabbit mask, putting on the mask and grabbing the plush triggers a new conversation between the player and the plush. The player, who is later revealed to be a beta tester named Vanny, tells the plush that no one suspects anything, assuring him that she won't let him down, completing Afton's control of Vanny.
 If the player fails to follow the tapes' instructions, they and Glitchtrap will body-swap, with the player being in Glitchtrap's place.
 If the player completes the Princess Quest level, exclusive to the mobile port of the game, the player's avatar, the Princess, confronts a monstrous form of Glitchtrap, who distortedly says "I always come back. Let me out."

After the non-VR version was released, there was a door in a level that leads to a snowy Christmas tree farm. In the distance, there is a silhouette of a large building being built by Fazbear, with a nearby billboard showing that they are now hiring.

Development
On August 19, 2018, Five Nights at Freddy's creator Scott Cawthon confirmed on his Steam thread that he would be making a Five Nights at Freddy's virtual reality game in collaboration with an unspecified studio. On March 25, 2019, during Sony Interactive Entertainment's State of Play live stream, announcing several new games coming to the PlayStation 4, a trailer announcing the game was shown, and the developer was confirmed to be Steel Wool Studios. The game debuted publicly at PAX East from March 28 to March 31, 2019, and was available at subsequent PSVR demonstrations before its release.

Five Nights at Freddy's creator Scott Cawthon initially approached Steel Wool Studios with the idea of recreating the original Five Nights at Freddy's in virtual reality. He liked the studio's first proof-of-concept so much that he expanded his initial plan to cover all of the previous Five Nights games. Many aspects of Cawthon's character designs had to be updated to look convincing and remain scary in a 3D environment, including their movements and finer details.

Music
Leon Riskin returned to compose the musical score for Five Nights at Freddy's: Help Wanted after composing Five Nights at Freddy's: Sister Location, Freddy Fazbear's Pizzeria Simulator, and Ultimate Custom Night. Additionally, composer Allen Simpson wrote the music cue "Twisted Birthday" and created the unused song "Freddy Fazbear's Pizza Theme Song" (also known as "Showtime"). In a news release, Cawthon said that "Showtime" could possibly be used in the future, but it "was left out of the game because it didn't feel right. It's not that it was unfinished, necessarily."

Release
First announced in August 2018, the game was released on May 28, 2019, for Oculus Rift and HTC Vive headsets on Microsoft Windows, and PlayStation VR headsets on PlayStation 4. A non-VR version of the game was released for Microsoft Windows and PlayStation 4 on December 17, 2019. A Nintendo Switch port was released on May 21, 2020. An Oculus Quest port was released on July 16, 2020. An Android port was released on October 26, 2020, and an iOS port was released the following day. An Xbox One port was then released three days later. The game is also among the top selling virtual reality games on Steam.

Tie-in media and merchandise
Prior to the release of Five Nights at Freddy's: Help Wanted, Funko released a wave of merchandise for the Blacklight animatronics, including pen toppers, mystery minis, keychain plushies, action figures, mini-figures, vinyl figures, and cereal boxes. Three McFarlane construction sets based on Parts and Services, Upper Vent Repair, and Corn Maze are set to release in 2021. Three Funko action figures based on Glitchtrap, Dreadbear, and Grimm Foxy are also set to release in the same year.

Downloadable content
Curse of Dreadbear is a Halloween-themed downloadable content pack for Five Nights at Freddy's: Help Wanted. The DLC was released in three parts, with several "waves" of new minigames released on October 23, October 29, and October 31, 2019, for a total of 10 new minigames. The DLC pack includes new animatronic characters, returning animatronics from previous games, and a Halloween-themed hub. Some of the new stages are re-skinned versions of existent minigames, such as a version of the FNAF 1 minigames called Danger! Keep Out! Notable new game modes include a shooting gallery similar to Walt Disney World's Buzz Lightyear's Space Ranger Spin, a free-roaming corn maze, and an assembly line in which the player must construct an animatronic. Curse of Dreadbear was released on all platforms except for the mobile, and Xbox One ports. The DLC was later released on the Oculus Quest version of the game in December 2020.

Sequels

The next game in the series was Five Nights at Freddy's: Special Delivery, a spin-off for the Android and iOS mobile operating systems, released on November 25, 2019. The game, which utilizes AR instead of VR, follows a similar premise to Help Wanted, presenting itself as a consumer product (in this case, an animatronic rental service) created by Fazbear Entertainment. The story is told mostly through e-mails that, in-universe, were accidentally sent to the player; these e-mails establish that the game takes place after the events of Help Wanted, because they mention events such as William Afton's possession of Vanny.

On August 8, 2019, on the first game's fifth anniversary, Cawthon posted a new image on his website, teasing the eighth main installment for the series. It shows a "Mega Pizza Plex" containing a laser tag arena, an arcade, a large cinema and a Freddy Fazbear's Pizza restaurant; in the main square, '80s-style versions of Freddy, Chica, and four completely new animatronics can be seen playing for an excited crowd. On September 29, 2019, Cawthon's website was updated with a new teaser featuring "Glamrock Freddy" and was followed by an updated teaser featuring the character Vanny from Help Wanted as a shadow. On March 24, 2020, another teaser featuring a brand new alligator-like character was posted, later revealed to be called Montgomery Gator. On June 12, 2020, another teaser was released, featuring the game's antagonist, Vanessa, a female security guard. On August 7, 2020, a teaser of Vanny was released. One day later, Scott revealed the characters Glamrock Chica and Roxanne Wolf via Reddit. On October 27, 2021, a trailer from Sony's State of Play Presentation containing gameplay footage and a release date dropped online, with the game releasing on December 16, 2021.

Reception

Five Nights at Freddy's: Help Wanted received "generally favorable" reviews from critics for the PlayStation 4 version according to review aggregator Metacritic, assigning a score of 80 out of 100; the Nintendo Switch version received "mixed or average" reviews, with Metacritic assigning a score of 53 out of 100. Reviewers praised the game for its effective use of virtual reality and its success in introducing new mechanics while preserving the series' feel and atmosphere, while being accessible for players new to the series. However, the game's frequent use of jump scares could make it less scary and more obnoxious over time for some players.

Stuart Gipp at Nintendo Life criticized the Nintendo Switch version of the game and gave it a score of 3 out of 10. The main criticism being that the game had become pointless for having removed the VR mode making it a "sub-par minigame collection" with "limited gameplay" since previous main games were available already for the console, and speculated that the only reason for releasing it for the console were to capitalize on the console's market share.

The game is listed as one of PlayStation's "Favorite Horror Games of 2019" on their website and is one of the top 30 best selling VR games on Steam.

The game was nominated for the Coney Island Dreamland Award for Best AR/VR Game at the New York Game Awards in 2020.

References

External links

 
 
 

2019 video games
Android (operating system) games
Five Nights at Freddy's
HTC Vive games
2010s horror video games
IOS games
Indie video games
Minigame compilations
Nintendo Switch games
Meta Quest games
Oculus Rift games
PlayStation 4 games
PlayStation VR games
Single-player video games
Unreal Engine games
Video games about robots
Video games developed in the United States
Video games set in Utah
Windows games
Works about missing people
Xbox One games
Video games featuring female protagonists